Spellbound is the sixth and final album by double bassist Ahmed Abdul-Malik featuring performances recorded in 1964 and originally released on the Status label.

Reception

Thom Jurek of Allmusic says, "Spellbound isn't as groundbreaking as some of Abdul-Malik's earlier work, but it doesn't need to be: by this point, he had successfully melded jazz with Middle Eastern sounds into a seamless -- if somewhat exotically textural -- whole. The band fires on all cylinders under his inspired direction, making this a fitting sendoff to him as a bandleader. Musically, he saved one of his best for last.".

Track listing
 "Spellbound" (Miklós Rózsa) – 4:57	
 "Never On Sunday" (Manos Hatzidakis) – 5:13	
 "Body and Soul" (Johnny Green, Edward Heyman, Robert Sour, Frank Eyton) – 7:14	
 "Song of Delilah" (Victor Young, Ray Evans) – 7:02
 "Cinema Blues" (Ahmed Abdul-Malik) – 8:15

Personnel
Ahmed Abdul-Malik – bass
Ray Nance – cornet, violin
Seldon Powell – tenor saxophone, flute
Paul Neves – piano
Hamza Aldeen – oud
Walter Perkins – drums

References

Prestige Records albums
Ahmed Abdul-Malik albums
1964 albums
Albums recorded at Van Gelder Studio
Albums produced by Don Schlitten